The following lists events that happened during 1991 in South Africa.

Incumbents
 State President: F.W. de Klerk.
 Chief Justice: Michael Corbett.

Events

January
 9 – Black children are admitted to schools previously reserved for whites only.
 9 – In Sebokeng gunmen fire on mourners attending the funeral of a leader of the African National Congress, killing 13.
 12 – 45 mourners are killed during an attack on a funeral vigil for an African National Congress member.
 13 – 45 football fans die in the Orkney Stadium Disaster in the Oppenheimer Stadium in Orkney.
 29 – State President F.W. de Klerk, deputy-president of the African National Congress Nelson Mandela and Inkatha Freedom Party leader Mangosuthu Buthelezi meet for peace talks.

February
 1 – At the signing of a national peace accord State President F.W. de Klerk promises to end all apartheid legislation and to create a new multi-racial constitution.
 25 – Chief Mhlabunzima Maphumulo is shot dead by an alleged hit-squad outside his home in Pietermaritzburg.

March
 11 March – A curfew is imposed on black townships after fighting between rival political gangs kills 49.
 12 – The government tables a white paper to end racial discrimination in land ownership and occupation.
 24 – Twelve people, including a police officer and two children, are killed when police opens fire on a crowd of African National Congress supporters attacking the police in Daveyton.

April
 15 – The European Economic Community lifts economic sanctions on South Africa.
 30 – A coup d'état is executed in Lesotho.

May
 14 – Winnie Madikizela-Mandela, dubbed the "Mugger of the Nation", is found guilty and sentenced to 6 years imprisonment for her involvement in the death of 14-year-old Stompie Moeketsi. The sentence will never be carried out.

June
 28 – The Population Registration Act in terms of which South Africans were classified into racial groups is repealed.
 30 – The laws enforcing geographical segregation, including the Group Areas Act, the Native Land Act, the Native Trust and Land Act and the Asiatic Land Tenure Act, are repealed.

July
 2–6 – The 48th National Conference of the African National Congress takes place in Durban, the first to be held in South Africa since 1959.
 9 – The suspension of South Africa from the International Olympic Committee is lifted.
 10 – President Bush announces the United States is ending its 1986-enacted sanctions on South Africa.

August
 4 – The Greek-owned cruise ship Oceanos sinks off Coffee Bay and all 571 passengers on board are safely evacuated by SAAF helicopters.
 9 – Right-wingers of the Afrikaner Weerstandsbeweging clash with the police in the Battle of Ventersdorp.

September
 4 – State President F.W. de Klerk announces a new constitution that will provide suffrage for black people.

October
 2 – Minister of Foreign Affairs Pik Botha visits Beijing to strengthen South Africa's relations with China.
 3 – Nadine Gordimer is awarded the 1991 Nobel Prize in Literature.

November
 4–5 – The African National Congress leads a general strike to demand a role in governing and an end to value-added tax.

December
 8 – Chris Hani becomes leader of the South African Communist Party.

Unknown date
 The Phinda Resource Reserve is formed.
 The great white shark is given full protection under South African law.

Births
 1 January – Jacob Maliekal, badminton player
 7 January – Bongi Mbonambi, rugby player
 9 February – Lyle Peters, footballer
 14 February – Alberto Mazzoncini, cricketer
 16 February – Marilyn Ramos, Miss South Africa 2012
 5 March – Kate Christowitz, rower
 11 March – Kamohelo Mokotjo, football player
 14 March – Frans Malherbe, rugby player
 2 April – Siobhan McColl, figure skater
 28 April – Liesl Laurie, model
 6 May – Ockie van Zyl, rugby player
 14 June – Kyle Jacobs, footballer
 16 June – Siya Kolisi, South Africa national rugby union team captain
 30 June – Kevin Paul, Paralympic swimmer
 8 July – Thuso Mbedu, actress
 30 July – Heinrich Klaasen, cricketer
 17 August – Zakir Kathrada, cricketer
 28 September – Michael van Vuuren, rugby player
 19 October – Faf de Klerk, rugby player
 29 October – Eben Etzebeth, rugby player
 25 November – Thandeka Zulu, actress & singer
 25 November – Damian de Allende, rugby player
 7 December – JP Jonck, rugby player
 10 December – Gugu Gumede, actress

Deaths
 24 February – John Charles Daly, South African-born journalist and game show host. (b. 1914)
 11 June – Cromwell Everson, composer. (b. 1925)

Railways

Locomotives
 Spoornet places three prototype Class 14E dual voltage electric mainline locomotives in stock service, following intensive testing. They are the first dual voltage 3 kV DC and 25 kV AC locomotives to see service in South Africa.

Sports

Athletics
12 to 17 September - 1991 ATP Tour World Championships

References

South Africa
Years in South Africa
History of South Africa